James Faulkner may refer to: 

 James Faulkner (actor) (born 1948), British television and film actor
 James Faulkner (cricketer) (born 1990), Australian cricketer
 James Faulkner (Livingston County, New York) (1790–1884), New York politician
 James Faulkner Jr. (1833–1909), New York assemblyman 1875, in 98th New York State Legislature
 James H. Faulkner (1916–2008), American media owner, education supporter, industrial recruiter, and politician
 James W. Faulkner (1863–1923), American journalist
 Jim Faulkner (1899–1962), American baseball player
 James Albert Faulkner (1877–1944), Canadian medical practitioner and politician
 James Hugh Faulkner (1933–2016), Canadian politician

See also 
 Faulkner (surname)